CSSRA may refer to:

 Canadian Secondary School Rowing Association
 Countries to which Special Security Regulations Apply, a term of the Intelligence Corps of the British Army